The 2000 Vuelta a España was the 55th edition of the Vuelta a España, one of cycling's Grand Tours. The Vuelta began in Málaga, with an individual time trial on 26 August, and Stage 11 occurred on 5 September with a stage to Arcalis. The race finished in Madrid on 17 September.

Stage 1
26 August 2000 — Málaga to Málaga,  (ITT)

Stage 2
27 August 2000 — Málaga to Córdoba,

Stage 3
28 August 2000 — Montoro to Valdepeñas,

Stage 4
29 August 2000 — Valdepeñas to Albacete,

Stage 5
30 August 2000 — Albacete to Xorret de Catí,

Stage 6
31 August 2000 — Benidorm to Valencia,

Stage 7
1 September 2000 — Valencia to Morella,

Stage 8
2 September 2000 — Vinaròs to Port Aventura,

Stage 9
3 September 2000 — Tarragona to Tarragona,  (ITT)

Stage 10
4 September 2000 — Sabadell to Supermolina,

Stage 11
5 September 2000 — Alp to Arcalis,

References

2000 Vuelta a España
Vuelta a España stages